Pearl of Wisdom may refer to:

Books 
Margarita Philosophica (The Pearl of Wisdom), encyclopaedia by Gregor Reisch (1504)
Pearl of Wisdom: Buddhist Prayers and Practices, by Thubten Chodron (2011)
Pearls of Wisdom: Little Pieces of Advice, by Barbara Bush (2020)

Television, Film and Video 
"Pearl of Wisdom", season 2, episode 18 of Fushigi no Kuni no Alice (Japan, 1984)
"Pearl of Wisdom", season 1, episode 25 of DuckTales (USA, 1987)
"Daytona Jones and the Pearl of Wisdom", episode 5 of The Chipmunks go to the Movies (USA, 1990)
"Pearl of Wisdom", season 3, episode 7 of The Librarians (Australia, 2010)
"The Pearl of Wisdom", film by Hugues Gentillon (Poland, 2015)
"Pearls of Wisdom – Bill Pearl: A Bodybuilding Legend" (DVD), a biographical documentary about Bill Pearl

Music 
"Pearls Of Wisdom" (song), track from the album Veil by Band of Susans (1993)
"Pearl of Wisdom" (instrumental), chamber piece by Paweł Łukaszewski (2005)
"Pearl of Wisdom" (song), track from the album Razorback Killers by Vicious Rumors (2011)

See also

 The Two Pearls of Wisdom (novel), 2008 fantasy novel by Alison Goodman
 advice (opinion)
 
 
 Wisdom (disambiguation)
 Pearl (disambiguation)